Argillana is a monotypic moth genus of the family Erebidae. Its only species, Argillana albistrigata, is found on New Guinea. Both the genus and the species were first described by George Thomas Bethune-Baker in 1908.

References

External links
Original description: Novitates Zoologicae: 237.

Hypeninae
Monotypic moth genera